Malinska is a settlement (naselje) in the northwestern part of the island Krk in Croatia and an important tourist town. It lies on the coast of the Adriatic Sea, in the picturesque bay facing Opatija and Rijeka.

The municipality of Malinska-Dubašnica has 3,134 inhabitants and the settlement itself has 965 (2011 census). Because of the catastrophic consequences of the privatization of the hotel complex "Haludovo", the main entity in Malinska, during the 1990s almost completely destroyed, which in turn led to the loss of at least 150 jobs. This was reflected at the population of Malinska, which decreased by one third.

The settlement of Malinska is about 15 minutes from the Rijeka airport and can also be reached by car from the mainland crossing the Krk bridge. The city of Krk is located 12 km to the south.

Every year on July 23 the traditional "Malinskarska Night" takes place — the day of the municipality and the feast of Saint Apollinaris, patron saint of the parish and settlement.

The parish church of St. Apollinaris is located in the vicinity - Bogovići. Built in the 19th century, it dominates Malinska. The new chapel of St. Nicholas in the center of the port was consecrated in 2000.

See also 
 Dubašnica

References

External links

 
 Malinska tourist board

Krk
Populated places in Primorje-Gorski Kotar County
Seaside resorts in Croatia